Fernán Caballero (24 December 1796 – 7 April 1877) was the pseudonym of Spanish novelist Cecilia Francisca Josefa Böhl de Faber y Ruiz de Larrea. She was daughter of German writer Johann Nikolaus Böhl von Faber and Spanish writer Frasquita Larrea. Her pen name was adopted from that of a village in the province of Ciudad Real.

Life
Born at Morges in Switzerland, Cecilia Francisca Josefa Böhl und Lütkens y Ruiz de Larrea was the daughter of Johann Nikolaus Böhl von Faber, a German merchant from Hamburg, who lived long in Spain, married Frasquita Larrea a native of Cádiz,  and he is creditably known to students of Spanish literature as the editor of the Floresta de rimas antiguas castellanas (1821–1825), and the Teatro español anterior a Lope de Vega (1832). She was educated principally at Hamburg, visited Spain in 1815, and in 1816 married Antonio Planells y Bardaxi, an infantry captain of bad character. In the following year Planells was killed in action, and in 1822 the young widow married Francisco Ruiz del Arco, Marqués de Arco Hermoso, an officer in one of the Spanish household regiments.

Upon the death of Arco Hermoso in 1835, the marquesa found herself in straitened circumstances, and in less than two years she married Antonio Arrom de Ayala, a man considerably her junior. Arrom was appointed consul in Australia, engaged in business enterprises and made money; but unfortunate speculations drove him to commit suicide in 1859. Ten years earlier the name of Fernán Caballero became famous in Spain as the author of La Gaviota. The writer had already published in German an anonymous romance, Sole (1840), and curiously enough the original draft of La Gaviota was written in French. Eugenio de Ochoa, a prominent critic of the day, ratified the popular judgment, and hopefully proclaimed the writer to be a rival of Walter Scott. No other Spanish book of the 19th century has obtained such instant and universal recognition. Translated into most European languages, it is the best of its author's works, with the possible exception of La Familia de Alvareda (which was written, first of all, in German).

Less successful attempts are Lady Virginia and Clemencia; but the short stories entitled Cuadros de Costumbres are interesting in matter and form, and Una en otra and Elia o la Espana treinta años ha are excellent specimens of picturesque narration. It would be difficult to maintain that Fernán Caballero was a great literary artist, but it is certain that she was a born teller of stories and that she has a graceful style very suitable to her purpose. She came into Spain at a most happy moment, before the new order had perceptibly disturbed the old, and she brought to bear not alone a fine natural gift of observation, but a freshness of vision, undulled by long familiarity. She combined the advantages of being both a foreigner and a native.

In later publications she insisted too emphatically upon the moral lesson, and lost much of her primitive simplicity and charm; but we may believe her statement that, though she occasionally idealized circumstances, she was conscientious in choosing for her themes subjects which had occurred in her own experience. Hence she may be regarded as a pioneer in the realistic field, and this historical fact adds to her positive importance. For many years she was the most popular of Spanish writers, and the sensation caused by her death at Seville on 7 April 1877 proved that her truthfulness still attracted readers who were interested in records of national customs and manners.

Her Obras completas are included in the Colección de escritores castellanos: a useful biography by Fernando de Gabriel Ruiz de Apodaca precedes the Últimas producciones de Fernán Caballero (Seville, 1878).

References

Sources

Palma, Angélica, 'Fernán Caballero: la novelista novelable', Madrid, Espasa Calpe, 1931
Jarilla Bravo, Salud Maria. "Los refranes recopilados por Fernán Caballero (II)". Paremia, vol. 30, 2020, pp. 199-204. Paremia PDF

External links 

 
 
 
 Encyclopædia Britannica Fernan Caballero
 Tauromachy in Fernán Caballero's Work
 Guide to the Fernán Caballero Papers 1855-1877  at the University of Chicago Special Collections Research Center 
 La Mitología contada a los niños e historia de los grandes hombres de la Grecia
 

1796 births
1877 deaths
19th-century Spanish writers
19th-century male writers
19th-century Spanish novelists
Spanish women novelists
Spanish people of German descent
Spanish people of Irish descent
People from Morges
Pseudonymous women writers
19th-century Spanish women writers
19th-century pseudonymous writers